Larry Paul Arnn (born October 8, 1952) is an American educator and writer. He has served as the twelfth president of private college Hillsdale College in Hillsdale, Michigan, since May 2000. He is a political conservative who has been influenced by the thought of Leo Strauss and Strauss’ student and Arnn’s teacher Harry V. Jaffa.

Early life and education
Born in Pocahontas, Arkansas, Arnn received his Bachelor of Arts degree in political science and accounting from Arkansas State University in 1974. He earned graduate degrees in government from Claremont Graduate School – an M.A. in 1976 and a Ph.D. in 1985. Arnn studied international history at the London School of Economics and modern history at Worcester College, Oxford University. While in England, he worked as Director of Research for Martin Gilbert, the official biographer of Winston Churchill, editing the final six document volumes of the Churchill biography.  His wife Penny is British. The couple married in 1979 and later moved to California where they had three children and adopted a fourth.  They moved to Michigan in the year 2000, when Larry Arnn succeeded George Roche as  president of Hillsdale College.  Larry Arnn's father-in-law was Colonel Denis Arthur Sydenham Houghton of Broughton, who was once High Sheriff of Lancashire.

Career 
In 1980, Arnn became an editor for Public Research, Syndicated in the United States. He was one of four founders of the Claremont Institute in Claremont, California, and served as its president from 1985 to 2000. In 2000, he was named the twelfth president of Hillsdale College. In this capacity, he set the ambitious goal of $400 million for the college's Founders Campaign, beginning in 2001, and under his watch, several new buildings have arisen on the campus.

Arnn has been a trustee of the conservative Heritage Foundation since 2002. In 2012 the Foundation offered its presidency to Arnn, who decided to stay in academe instead.

Arnn also sits on the boards of directors of the Henry Salvatori Center for the Study of Individual Freedom in the Modern World at Claremont McKenna College, the Center for Individual Rights, and the Claremont Institute. Additionally, he serves as a member of the Board of Advisors for Landmark Legal Foundation. He is a member of the Mont Pelerin Society, the Churchill Centre, and the Philanthropy Roundtable. As of 2014, he was listed as a member of the Council for National Policy in their directory.

Discussing politics at Hillsdale, Arnn remarked, "If you take the reading of an old book on the view that it's valuable, you have already discarded the modern Left." Arnn supported Donald Trump for President in the 2016 United States presidential election.

In December 2020, he was appointed chair of the 1776 Commission.

Controversies

Comments about Common Core 

In 2013, Arnn was criticized for his remarks about ethnic minorities when he testified before the Michigan State Legislature. In testimony against the Common Core curriculum standards, in which Arnn expressed concern about government interference with educational institutions, he recalled that shortly after he assumed the presidency at Hillsdale he received a letter from the state Department of Education that said his college "violated the standards for diversity," adding, "because we didn't have enough dark ones, I guess, is what they meant." After being criticized for calling minorities "dark ones", he explained that he was referring to "dark faces", saying: "The State of Michigan sent a group of people down to my campus, with clipboards ... to look at the colors of people's faces and write down what they saw. We don't keep records of that information. What were they looking for besides dark ones?" Michigan House Democratic Leader Tim Greimel condemned Arnn for his comments, which he called "offensive" and "inflammatory and bigoted", and asked for an apology. The College issued a statement apologizing for Arnn's remark, while reiterating Arnn's concern about "state sponsored racism" in the form of affirmative action policies.

Comments about teachers 
In July 2022, as an education advisor to Governor Bill Lee of Tennessee, Arnn made a number of remarks condemned by people in both parties, including the following:

"The teachers are trained in the dumbest parts of the dumbest colleges in the country....You will see how education destroys generations of people....It's devastating. It's like the plague. We are going to try to demonstrate that you don't have to be an expert to educate a child because basically anybody can do it."

Governor Lee refused to condemn Arnn's remarks, but did say Arnn was only talking about "left-wing" teachers.

Bibliography
 Liberty and Learning: The Evolution of American Education (2004)  
 The Founders' Key: The Divine and Natural Connection Between the Declaration and the Constitution and What We Risk by Losing It (2012)  
 "Churchill's Trial: Winston Churchill and the Salvation of Free Government" (2015)

References

External links
 

Living people
People from Pocahontas, Arkansas
Arkansas State University alumni
Hillsdale College people
Heads of universities and colleges in the United States
The Heritage Foundation
Arkansas Republicans
Michigan Republicans
California Republicans
1952 births